Simcyp Limited is a research-based company which provides modelling and simulation software to the pharmaceutical industry for use during drug development. Simcyp is based in Sheffield, UK.

Simcyp’s Simulators allow in silico prediction of drug absorption, distribution, metabolism and excretion (ADME) and potential drug-drug interactions.

Research and development
Simcyp’s R&D activities focus on the development of algorithms along with population and drug databases for modelling and simulation (M&S) of the absorption and disposition of drugs in patients and specific subgroups of patients across different age ranges. The Simcyp models use experimental data generated routinely during pre-clinical drug discovery and development from in vitro enzyme and cellular systems, as well as any relevant physico-chemical attributes of the drug and dosage forms. Some details of the scientific background to Simcyp approaches can be found in recent publications.

Background
Simcyp originally formed as a spin-out company from the University of Sheffield, UK. The company operates the Simcyp Consortium of pharmaceutical and biotechnology companies. The Consortium acts as a steering committee, guiding scientific research and development at Simcyp. There is also close collaboration with regulatory bodies (the U.S. Food and Drug Administration, Swedish Medical Products Agency, NAM, ECVAM) and academic centres of excellence worldwide, within the framework of the Consortium.

Simulator platforms
Simulator platforms include the Simcyp population-based ADME Simulator, Simcyp Paediatric, Simcyp Rat, Simcyp Dog, and Simcyp Mouse.

Simcyp Simulator
The Simcyp Simulator is a population-based ADME simulator is a modelling and simulation platform used by the pharmaceutical industry in drug discovery and development. The Simulator models drug absorption, distribution, metabolism and elimination using routinely generated in vitro data.

Simcyp simulations are performed in virtual populations, including paediatric populations, rather than an average individual. This allows individuals at extreme risk from adverse reaction to be identified prior to human studies. The functional capability of the Simcyp  Simulator are summarized in the following table.

References

External links
 http://www.simcyp.com
 https://www.certara.com/

Software companies of the United Kingdom